Major-General Victor David Graham Campbell  (9 March 1905 – 4 June 1990) was a British Army officer of the Second World War and post-war period.

Early life
Campbell was the son of General Sir David Campbell and Janet Mary Aikman. He was educated at Rugby School and the Royal Military College, Sandhurst.

Military career
He commissioned into the Queen's Own Cameron Highlanders on 30 August 1924. He was promoted to captain in 1935, and between 1933 and 1935 served as Adjutant of the 2nd Battalion, The Queen's Own Cameron Highlanders at Aldershot. Campbell then served as an instructor at RMC Sandhurst until 1938. In 1939 he undertook the staff course at the Staff College, Camberley, before serving with his regiment in the Battle of France. On 12 June 1940 he was captured by German forces and became a prisoner-of-war. He was kept at Colditz Castle from 1942 until his liberation in 1945, when he was awarded the Distinguished Service Order.

Between October 1945 and July 1946, Campbell served with the Allied HQ in the Netherlands East Indies, after which he was invested as an Officer of the Order of the British Empire. In February 1949 he transferred to the Gordon Highlanders and became commander of the regiment's 1st Battalion. Between December 1950 and November 1952 he was Commanding Officer, 31st Lorried Infantry Brigade in the British Army of the Rhine. From 1954 to 1957 he was Chief of Staff, HQ Scottish Command, and retired on 6 April 1957 with the rank of major-general. In 1956 he was invested as a Companion of the Order of the Bath.

Other work
Campbell became a Justice of the Peace in 1962, and in April 1962 became a Deputy Lieutenant for Devon. He served as High Sheriff of Devon in 1968.

Personal life
He married Dulce Beatrix, daughter of G.B. Collier and the widow of Lt. Col. J.A. Goodwin, in 1947. Campbell died in South Brent, Devon in 1990.

References

External links
British Army Officers 1939−1945

1905 births
1990 deaths
British Army major generals
British Army personnel of World War II
British World War II prisoners of war
Commanders of the Order of the British Empire
Companions of the Order of the Bath
Companions of the Distinguished Service Order
Deputy Lieutenants of Devon
Gordon Highlanders officers
Graduates of the Royal Military College, Sandhurst
Graduates of the Staff College, Camberley
High Sheriffs of Devon
People educated at Rugby School
Queen's Own Cameron Highlanders officers
World War II prisoners of war held by Germany
Academics of the Royal Military College, Sandhurst